The 2023 Pittsburgh Panthers baseball team is a baseball team that represents the University of Pittsburgh in the 2023 NCAA Division I baseball season. The Panthers are members of the Atlantic Coast Conference in the Coastal Division and play their home games at Charles L. Cost Field in Pittsburgh, Pennsylvania. They are led by fifth-year head coach Mike Bell.

Previous season
The Panthers finished the 2022 NCAA Division I baseball season 29–27 overall (13–16 conference) and sixth place in the Costal Division standings. Following the conclusion of the regular season, the Panthers were selected to play in the 2022 ACC Tournament. The Panthers would eventually lose in Pool Play 1–2 to NC State Wolfpack.

Roster

Schedule

! style="" | Regular Season
|- valign="top"

|- align="center" bgcolor="#ccffcc"
| 1 || February 17 || || vs  || Ed Smith Complex • Sarasota, Florida || 11–10 || Bryan (1–0) || Carson (0–1) || Deveraux (1) || – || 1–0 || –
|- align="center" bgcolor="#ffcccc"
| 2 || February 18 || || vs Maine || Ed Smith Complex • Sarasota, Florida || 7–11 || Holt (1–0) || Firoved (0–1) || Baeyens (1) || – || 1–1 || –
|- align="center" bgcolor="#ffcccc"
| 3 || February 19 || || vs Maine || Ed Smith Complex • Sarasota, Florida || 5–8 || Gambardella (1–0) || Fernandez (0–1) || Scott (1) || – || 1–2 || –
|- align="center" bgcolor="#ccffcc"
| 4 || February 24 || || vs  || Centennial Park • Port Charlotte, Florida || 12–10 || Bryan (2–0) || Narottam (0–1) || – || – || 2–2 || –
|- align="center" bgcolor="#ffcccc"
| 5 || February 25 || || vs Harvard || Centennial Park • Port Charlotte, Florida || 4-8 || Stovern (1–0) || Fernandez (0–2) || – || – || 2–3 || –
|- align="center" bgcolor="#ccffcc"
| 6 || February 25 || || vs Harvard || Centennial Park • Port Charlotte, Florida || 11-3 (7) || Sokol (1–0) || Matson (0–1) || Simmons (1) || – || 3–3 || –
|- align="center" bgcolor="#ccffcc"
| 7 || February 26 || || vs Harvard || Centennial Park • Port Charlotte, Florida || 17-7 (8) || Bryan (3–0) || Jacobsen (0–1) || – || – || 4–3 || –
|- align="center" bgcolor="#ccffcc"
| 8 || February 28 || ||  || Charles L. Cost Field • Pittsburgh, Pennsylvania || 11–8 || Konuszewski (1–0) || Farynick (0–1) || Bryan (1) || 254 || 5–3 || –
|-

|- align="center" bgcolor="#ffcccc"
| 9 || March 3 || || vs  || Melching Field at Conrad Park • DeLand, Florida || 4–7 || Adams (2–0) || Mosley (0–1) || Slepak (3) || – || 5–4 || –
|- align="center" bgcolor="#ccffcc"
| 10 || March 4 || || vs Mount St. Mary's || Melching Field at Conrad Park • DeLand, Florida || 10–2 || Sokol (2–0) || Pryor (0–1) || – || 563 || 6–4 || –
|- align="center" bgcolor="#ffcccc"
| 11 || March 4 || || at  || Melching Field at Conrad Park • DeLand, Florida || 5–6 || Durgin (1–1) || Bryan (3–1) || – || 821 || 6–5 || –
|- align="center" bgcolor="#ccffcc"
| 12 || March 5 || || at Stetson || Melching Field at Conrad Park • DeLand, Florida || 9–2 || Candelario (1–0) || Jacobs (0–1) || – || 672 || 7–5 || –
|- align="center" bgcolor="#ffcccc"
| 13 || March 7 || || at  || USF Baseball Stadium • Tampa, Florida || 1–2 || Hudi (1–1) || Phelps (0–1) || Skeen (1) || 982 || 7–6 || –
|- align="center" bgcolor="#ffcccc"
| 14 || March 10 || || at  || Mike Martin Field at Dick Howser Stadium • Tallahassee, Florida || 2–3 || Arnold (1–0) || Bryan (3–2) || None || 4,376 || 7–7 || 0–1
|- align="center" bgcolor="#ffcccc"
| 15 || March 11 || || at Florida State || Mike Martin Field at Dick Howser Stadium • Tallahassee, Florida || 3–5 || Crowell (3–0) || Mosley (0–2) || Armstrong (2) || 6,300 || 7–8 || 0–2
|- align="center" bgcolor="#ccffcc"
| 16 || March 12 || || at Florida State || Mike Martin Field at Dick Howser Stadium • Tallahassee, Florida || 8–6 || Fernandez (1–2) || Denison (1–2) || Bautista (1) || 4,167 || 8–8 || 1–2
|- align="center" bgcolor="#ffcccc"
| 17 || March 17 || || #18 North Carolina || Charles L. Cost Field • Pittsburgh, Pennsylvania || 7–17 || Bovair (2–1) || Sokol (2–1) || None || 289 || 8–9 || 1–3
|- align="center" bgcolor="#cccccc"
| 18 || March 18 || || #18 North Carolina || Charles L. Cost Field • Pittsburgh, Pennsylvania ||colspan=7| Game cancelled
|- align="center" bgcolor="#cccccc"
| 19 || March 19 || || #18 North Carolina || Charles L. Cost Field • Pittsburgh, Pennsylvania ||colspan=7| Game cancelled
|- align="center" bgcolor=
| 20 || March 22 || ||  || Charles L. Cost Field • Pittsburgh, Pennsylvania || – || – || – || – || – || – || –
|- align="center" bgcolor=
| 21 || March 24 || || Virginia Tech || Charles L. Cost Field • Pittsburgh, Pennsylvania || – || – || – || – || – || – || –
|- align="center" bgcolor=
| 22 || March 25 || || Virginia Tech || Charles L. Cost Field • Pittsburgh, Pennsylvania || – || – || – || – || – || – || –
|- align="center" bgcolor=
| 23 || March 26 || || Virginia Tech || Charles L. Cost Field • Pittsburgh, Pennsylvania || – || – || – || – || – || – || –
|- align="center" bgcolor=
| 24 || March 28 || || at  || Medlar Field • University Park, Pennsylvania || – || – || – || – || – || – || –
|- align="center" bgcolor=
| 25 || March 31 || || at  || Jack Coombs Field • Durham, North Carolina || – || – || – || – || – || – || –
|-

|- align="center" bgcolor=
| 26 || April 2 || || at Duke || Jack Coombs Field • Durham, North Carolina || – || – || – || – || – || – || –
|- align="center" bgcolor=
| 27 || April 3 || || at Duke || Jack Coombs Field • Durham, North Carolina || – || – || – || – || – || – || –
|- align="center" bgcolor=
| 28 || April 4 || || at Youngstown State || Eastwood Field • Niles, Ohio || – || – || – || – || – || – || –
|- align="center" bgcolor=
| 29 || April 6 || ||  || Charles L. Cost Field • Pittsburgh, Pennsylvania || – || – || – || – || – || – || –
|- align="center" bgcolor=
| 30 || April 7 || || Notre Dame || Charles L. Cost Field • Pittsburgh, Pennsylvania || – || – || – || – || – || – || –
|- align="center" bgcolor=
| 31 || April 8 || || Notre Dame || Charles L. Cost Field • Pittsburgh, Pennsylvania || – || – || – || – || – || – || –
|- align="center" bgcolor=
| 32 || April 10 || || Youngstown State || Charles L. Cost Field • Pittsburgh, Pennsylvania || – || – || – || – || – || – || –
|- align="center" bgcolor=
| 33 || April 11 || || at Kent State || Schoonover Stadium • Kent, Ohio || – || – || – || – || – || – || –
|- align="center" bgcolor=
| 34 || April 14 || || at Virginia || Davenport Field at Disharoon Park • Charlottesville, Virginia || – || – || – || – || – || – || –
|- align="center" bgcolor=
| 35 || April 15 || || at Virginia || Davenport Field at Disharoon Park • Charlottesville, Virginia || – || – || – || – || – || – || –
|- align="center" bgcolor=
| 36 || April 16 || || at Virginia || Davenport Field at Disharoon Park • Charlottesville, Virginia || – || – || – || – || – || – || –
|- align="center" bgcolor=
| 37 || April 19 || || vs West Virginia || PNC Park • Pittsburgh, Pennsylvania || – || – || – || – || – || – || –
|- align="center" bgcolor=
| 38 || April 21 || ||  || Charles L. Cost Field • Pittsburgh, Pennsylvania || – || – || – || – || – || – || –
|- align="center" bgcolor=
| 39 || April 22 || || Wake Forest || Charles L. Cost Field • Pittsburgh, Pennsylvania || – || – || – || – || – || – || –
|- align="center" bgcolor=
| 40 || April 23 || || Wake Forest || Charles L. Cost Field • Pittsburgh, Pennsylvania || – || – || – || – || – || – || –
|- align="center" bgcolor=
| 41 || April 28 || ||  || Charles L. Cost Field • Pittsburgh, Pennsylvania || – || – || – || – || – || – || –
|- align="center" bgcolor=
| 42 || April 29 || || California || Charles L. Cost Field • Pittsburgh, Pennsylvania || – || – || – || – || – || – || –
|- align="center" bgcolor=
| 43 || April 30 || || California || Charles L. Cost Field • Pittsburgh, Pennsylvania || – || – || – || – || – || – || –
|-

|- align="center" bgcolor=
| 44 || May 3 || || at West Virginia || Monongalia County Ballpark • Morgantown, West Virginia || – || – || – || – || – || – || –
|- align="center" bgcolor=
| 45 || May 5 || || at  || Bobby Dodd Stadium • Atlanta, Georgia || – || – || – || – || – || – || –
|- align="center" bgcolor=
| 46 || May 6 || || at Georgia Tech || Bobby Dodd Stadium • Atlanta, Georgia || – || – || – || – || – || – || –
|- align="center" bgcolor=
| 47 || May 7 || || at Georgia Tech || Bobby Dodd Stadium • Atlanta, Georgia || – || – || – || – || – || – || –
|- align="center" bgcolor=
| 48 || May 10 || || West Virginia || Charles L. Cost Field • Pittsburgh, Pennsylvania || – || – || – || – || – || – || –
|- align="center" bgcolor=
| 49 || May 12 || ||  || Charles L. Cost Field • Pittsburgh, Pennsylvania || – || – || – || – || – || – || –
|- align="center" bgcolor=
| 50 || May 13 || || Miami (FL) || Charles L. Cost Field • Pittsburgh, Pennsylvania || – || – || – || – || – || – || –
|- align="center" bgcolor=
| 51 || May 14 || || Miami (FL) || Charles L. Cost Field • Pittsburgh, Pennsylvania || – || – || – || – || – || – || –
|- align="center" bgcolor=
| 52 || May 16 || || vs Penn State || PNC Park • Pittsburgh, Pennsylvania || – || – || – || – || – || – || –
|- align="center" bgcolor=
| 53 || May 18 || || at  || Doak Field • Raleigh, North Carolina || – || – || – || – || – || – || –
|- align="center" bgcolor=
| 54 || May 19 || || at NC State || Doak Field • Raleigh, North Carolina || – || – || – || – || – || – || –
|- align="center" bgcolor=
| 55 || May 20 || || at NC State || Doak Field • Raleigh, North Carolina || – || – || – || – || – || – || –
|}
</div></div>
|}

References

Pittsburgh
Pittsburgh Panthers baseball seasons
Pittsburgh